Clarence Alfred Eric White (27 February 1914 – 22 May 1991) was an Australian rules footballer who played with Footscray and St Kilda in the Victorian Football League (VFL).

Notes

External links 

1914 births
1991 deaths
Australian rules footballers from Victoria (Australia)
Western Bulldogs players
St Kilda Football Club players
West Footscray Football Club players
Preston Football Club (VFA) players